In mathematics, a partition cardinal is either:

An Erdős cardinal; or
A Strong partition cardinal.